Inner Lee Island is a small island  north-northeast of Luck Point, lying in the Bay of Isles, South Georgia. This island was charted in 1912–13 by Robert Cushman Murphy, an American naturalist abroad the brig Daisy, who included it as one of two islands which called the "Lee Islands". These islands were recharted in 1929–30 by Discovery Investigations personnel, who renamed this southwestern of the two, Inner Lee Island. The northeastern island is now known as Outer Lee Island.

See also 
 List of Antarctic and sub-Antarctic islands

References

Islands of South Georgia